Louis François Dauprat (24 May 1781 – 16 July 1868) was a French horn player, composer and professor at the Conservatoire de Paris. He played and taught natural horn only, but was also very interested in the first experiments with keyed horns. He successfully ensured the development of a distinctively French school of playing, marginally influenced by the invention of the valve horn.

Biography
Born in Paris, Dauprat first studied in the Paris Conservatory with Johann Joseph Kenn and in 1795, setting up in his horn class where he won the 1798 "Premier Prix". As a prize, he was awarded with an experimental horn model made by Lucien Joseph Raoux's studio, now one of the most impressive pieces in the museum of the Paris Conservatory.
   
From 1806 to 1808, he was the principal hornist in the orchestra of the Grand Théâtre de Bordeaux, and from 1808 to 1811, he worked for the Paris Opera Orchestra and the Paris Conservatory. He succeeded his teacher as professor in the Conservatory and held that position until 1833 when he was succeeded by the famous solo horn player (and his own former student) Jacques-François Gallay.

Dauprat wrote the textbook Méthode pour cor alto et cor basse (Paris, 1824), which is of much historical and methodological interest, and wrote five concertos for horn and orchestra and various compositions for chamber ensembles.

He died in Paris.

Works

 1st Horn Concerto, Op. 1
 Sonata for Horn and Harp, Op. 2
 3 Quintets for Horn and String Quartet, Op. 6
 2nd Horn Concerto, Op. 9
 Sextet, for 6 Horns in different tunes, Op. 10
 Trio for 3 Horns and Piano or Orchestra, Op. 15
 3rd Horn Concerto for Alto and Bass Horns, Op. 18 
 4th Horn Concerto Hommage a la Memoire de Punto, Op. 19
 5th Horn Concerto for Alto and Bass Horns, Op. 21
 Mélodie, Op. 25
 Concertino for Horn Ensemble
 Six Quartets for 4 Horns
 Three Grand Trios for 3 Horns
 Six Trios for 3 Horns
 Several works for Horn and Piano

References

Bibliography
 Jean Gribenski, Roger Cotte: "Dauprat, Louis-François", in Die Musik in Geschichte und Gegenwart (MGG), biographical part, vol. 5 (Kassel: Bärenreiter, 2001, cc. 474–476.

External links

1781 births
1868 deaths
19th-century classical composers
19th-century French composers
19th-century French male musicians
Academic staff of the Conservatoire de Paris
Conservatoire de Paris alumni
French classical horn players
French male classical composers
French Romantic composers
Musicians from Paris